Norman Mitchell Lake was named in honour of L/Col C. Norman Mitchell on October 25, 2013 in central Manitoba, approximately 90 kilometres east of Thompson, Manitoba. The lake is located at 55° 41’ 48" latitude and 96° 12’ 43 longitude.

References

Lakes of Manitoba